The 1999 Russian Indoor Athletics Championships was the 8th edition of the National Championship in indoor track and field for Russia. It was held on 18–19 February at the Alexander Gomelsky Universal Sports Hall CSKA in Moscow. A total of 26 events (13 for men and 13 for women) were contested over the two-day competition. It was used for selection of the Russian team for the 1999 IAAF World Indoor Championships. 

The Russian Combined Events Indoor Championships was held separately on 12–14 February in Chelyabinsk at the Ural State University of Physical Culture arena.

Results

Men

Women

Russian Combined Events Indoor Championships

Men

Women

International team selection
Following the results of the championships, taking into account the qualifying standards, the Russian team for the 1999 IAAF World Indoor Championships included:

Men
400 m: Ruslan Mashchenko‡ 
1500 m: Andrey Zadorozhnyy
High jump: Pyotr Brayko‡, Vyacheslav Voronin
Shot put: Pavel Chumachenko
Heptathlon: Lev Lobodin

Women
200 m: Svetlana Goncharenko, Oksana Ekk
400 m: Olga Kotlyarova†, Natalya Nazarova
4 × 400 m relay: Olga Kotlyarova, Natalya Nazarova, Tatyana Chebykina, Natalya Sharova, Yekaterina Kulikova
800 m: Natalya Tsyganova, Natalya Gorelova
1500 m: Svetlana Kanatova, Olga Komyagina
3000 m: Olga Yegorova
60 m hurdles: Irina Korotya
High jump: Viktoriya Seregina, Yuliya Lyakhova
Pole vault: Yelena Belyakova
Long jump: Tatyana Kotova, Nina Perevedentseva
Triple jump: Yelena Lebedenko†, Elena Donkina
Shot put: Irina Korzhanenko, Svetlana Krivelyova
Pentathlon: Irina Belova, Natalya Roshchupkina

† Had exemption for selection and allowed not to compete at the national championships 
‡ Later withdrew from the international competition

References

Results

Russian Indoor Athletics Championships
Russian Indoor Athletics Championships
Russian Indoor Athletics Championships
Russian Indoor Athletics Championships
Sports competitions in Moscow
1999 in Moscow